Bloody Nose, Empty Pockets is an American documentary film that premiered at the 2020 Sundance Film Festival.

Background
It was directed by Bill Ross IV and Turner Ross. It has a 91% rating on Rotten Tomatoes, and critics wondered if it is a true documentary or partly fiction, perhaps as something that is a new genre, but regardless, generally praised the film. It is about a dive bar in Las Vegas named the Roaring 20s, though due to cost restraints (of filming in Las Vegas) it was actually filmed inside a bar in Terrytown, Louisiana. It includes a number of characters at the bar and tells vignettes about them. It runs for one hour and thirty-eight minutes.

References

External links 
 

American documentary films
2020 documentary films
2020 films
2020s American films